Ingleby may refer to:

Places 
 Ingleby, Derbyshire, England, a hamlet and civil parish
 Ingleby, Lincolnshire, England, a hamlet
 Ingleby, Pennsylvania, United States, a ghost town

People 
 Charles Ingleby, English judge
 Charles Ingleby (cricketer) (1870-1939), cricketer
 Francis Ingleby (c. 1551–1586), Roman Catholic martyr
 Harley Ingleby, Australian professional longboard surfrider
 Holcombe Ingleby (1854–1926), English solicitor and Conservative Party politician
 James Ingleby (born 1945), Scottish Lord-Lieutenant of Aberdeenshire
John Ingleby (disambiguation)
 Lee Ingleby (born 1976), British film, television, and stage actor
 Ray Ingleby, English businessman and entrepreneur

Titles 
 Ingilby baronets, three baronetcies created for members of the Ingilby family
 Viscount Ingleby, a title in the Peerage of the United Kingdom

See also 
 Ingleby Arncliffe, North Yorkshire, England
 Ingleby Barwick, North Yorkshire, England
 Ingleby Greenhow, North Yorkshire, England